Thieves' Guild 9: Escape From the Ashwood Mines is a supplement published by Gamelords in 1983 for the fantasy role-playing game Thieves' Guild. It is the ninth of ten books in the series.

Contents
In the Thieves' Guild fantasy role-playing game, players take on the roles of thieves in an underworld of crime. In a series of supplements, Gamelords presented a number of adventures as well as extra rules.  Thieves' Guild 9 is a sourcebook that contains two adventures: 
 the adventurers must rescue a foreign nobleman, who has been framed for murder and sentenced to the mines.
 Part 2 of "Secret of the Crystal Mountains": the players continue to seek a treasure of glowing crystals. (Part 1 was in Thieves' Guild 8).

Publication history
Gamelords first published Thieves' Guild in 1980. Over the next four years, they released nine more supplements, including 1983's Thieves' Guild 9: Escape From the Ashwood Mines, a 32-page softcover book, was written by Bob Traynor, Janet Trautvetter, Alfred Hipkins, and Kerry Lloyd, with artwork by Becky Harding, Denis Loubet, Wallace Miller, Larry Shade, Hannah M. G. Shapero, John Statema, and Janet Trautvetter.

Reception
Chris Hunter reviewed both Thieves' Guild 8 and Thieves' Guild 9 for Imagine magazine, and stated that "The scenarios are all very good though some need a little extra work to flesh them out."

Reviews
Different Worlds #45 (March/April, 1987)

References

Role-playing game supplements introduced in 1983
Thieves' Guild (role-playing game) supplements